Countess Johanna Sophia of Hohenlohe-Langenburg (born 16 December 1673 in Langenburg; died: 18 August 1743 in Stadthagen) was a German noblewoman, by birth member of the House of Hohenlohe and by marriage Countess of Schaumburg-Lippe.

Early life 
Countess Johanna Sophia von Hohenlohe-Langenburg was the sixth daughter of Count Henry Frederick of Hohenlohe-Langenburg and his second wife, Dorothea Juliana, Countess of Castell-Remlingen (1640-1706). Besides her beauty, she was also a clever and apt pupil.

Marriage and issue 
On 4 January 1691 in Langenburg Johanna Sophia married Count Frederick Christian of Schaumburg-Lippe (1655–1728).  Early in their marriage, she was allowed to accompany her husband, who traveled a great deal, but later was left behind more often. When disagreements erupted between Johanna Sophie and her husband, she moved with her two sons to Hanover. The marriage ended in divorce in 1723. Two years later, on 3 December 1725 Frederick Christian married his mistress, Maria Anna Victoria von Gall (1707-1760), daughter of Johann Michael von Gall and his wife, Maria Anna von Enzenberg.

Johanna Sophia and Frederick Christian had the following children:
 Frederick August (1693–1694)
 Wilhelm Ludwig (1695-1695)
 Sophie Charlotte (1697-1697)
 Philip (1697–1698)
 Albert Wolfgang (1699–1748), Count of Schaumburg-Lippe 1728-1748
 Frederick Charles Louis (1702–1776)

Later life 
Johanna Sophia became friends with the Electoral Princess Caroline of Brandenburg-Ansbach (1683–1737), later wife of King George II and accompanied her to the United Kingdom.  The Countess was a Lady-in-waiting at the English court of the Kings of Hanover in London.

References 
 Anna-Franziska von Schweinitz: Johanna Sophia Gräfin zu Schaumburg-Lippe, Gräfin zu Hohenlohe-Langenburg (1673–1743). Ein Leben an den Höfen von Langenburg, Bückeburg, Hannover und St. James, in: Lebensbilder aus Baden-Württemberg, Stuttgart 2001, pp. 100–128
 Liselotte von der Pfalz: Briefe an Johanna Sophie von Schaumburg-Lippe, annotated and with an afterword, ed. by Jürgen Voss, in: Kleines Archiv des 18. Jahrhunderts, Röhrig Universitätsverlag, St. Ingbert, 2003, p. 136 ff

External links 
 

1673 births
1743 deaths
Johanna Sophie
Johanna Sophie
17th-century German people
18th-century German people
People from Schwäbisch Hall (district)